Vieska nad Žitavou is a village and municipality in Zlaté Moravce District of the Nitra Region, in western-central Slovakia.

History
In historical records the village was first mentioned in 1406.

Geography
The municipality lies at an altitude of 170 metres and covers an area of 5.465 km2. It has a population of about 442 people.

References

External links
http://www.e-obce.sk/obec/vieskanadzitavou/vieska-nad-zitavou.html

Villages and municipalities in Zlaté Moravce District